Conor Burke may refer to:
 Conor Burke (rugby union), (born 1974), Irish rugby union player
 Conor Burke (hurler), (born 1998) is an Irish hurler
 Conor Burke (baseball), or Conor O. Burke, American baseball coach and former outfielder